Catherine Pégard (born 5 August 1954) is a French political journalist. She has spent most of her career at Le Point where she was editor. In 2007, she was appointed adviser to President of France, Nicolas Sarkozy, and in charge of the "political center" at the Élysée Palace from March 2008. Since 2011, she has headed Public Establishment of the Palace, Museum and National Estate of Versailles that administer the Palace of Versailles. Pégard was awarded Chevalier de la Légion d'honneur in 2012.

Early career 

Pégard was born in Le Havre and after high school had her first experience with journalism under the leadership of Roger Campion, the editor of the local Le Havre Libre.

After studying history and political science, Pégard began her journalistic career in 1977. From 1978 to 1982, she wrote about politics in Le Quotidien de Paris.

At Le Point 

Pégard joined Le Point as a political journalist in 1982. She covered in particular the area of parliamentary news. When Denis Jeambar became editor-in-chief in 1988, as well as editor-in-chief of the political and cultural departments, Pégard became his assistant. After Jeambar left and became general director of Europe 1 in 1995, Pégard took over as editor-in-chief of Le Point.

Pégard published a weekly "Political notebook" in Le Point fed from the backstage of politics. At the same time, she discussed political news on Radio Classique with Jean-Marc Lech. From October 2004, she also co-hosted the show Les Femmes et les Patrons d'abord ("The Women and the Patrons First") on Paris Première alongside Alexandra Golovanoff.

At the Elysee 

Pégard left Le Point in 2007, when she was appointed adviser to President Nicolas Sarkozy. The appointment of a journalist-editor from a major newspaper such as Le Point as advisor to the President sparked controversy. Asked about the issue of relations between the press and politics in France, the reporter John Vinocur from the International Herald Tribune responded in an interview by Renaud Revel in L'Express (31 May 2007): "I think that you exaggerate the complicity of the links that in reality exist in all the democracies of the world. Journalists have become the scapegoats of a society at odds with its elites."

Independent advisor to the President from May 2007, Pégard in mid-March 2008 became the head of the new "political center" created by the Presidency, integrating the closest collaborators of the President. She was assisted by Jerome Peyrat, the councilor in charge of the President's relations with Parliament. Catherine Pégard subsequently was responsible for cultural matters at the Elysee.

At Versailles 

Pégard was appointed to the presidency of the Public Establishment of the Palace, Museum and National Estate of Versailles by the Cabinet of France on 31 August 2011, and took office on 2 October, succeeding Jean-Jacques Aillagon, who went on pension.

The appointment of Pégard was denounced publicly by some heritage professionals, regretting that she lacked experience in the management of cultural administration.

In 2013, Pégard endorsed an exhibition with photographs by Ahae, the South Korean businessman Yoo Byung-eun, praising his artistic qualities. Pégard disclosed that the exhibition was on a sponsorship basis, saying "The artist himself wanted to rent the Orangerie. But we never communicate the numbers." French Le Monde and British The Times wrote that Ahae gave  million (~ million) to Versailles. Ahae is the sole patron of the Bosquet du Théâtre d'Eau (Water Theatre Grove) (fr) currently being recreated in the area of the Palace of Versailles, donating  million (~ million). Following the sinking of the ferry Sewol in April 2014, Pégard's decision to rent out the Orangerie Hall of the Palace of Versailles in 2013 to Yoo Byung-eun, prompted French media as well as Korean expatriates in France to raise their concerns over French cultural institutions accepting self-financed exhibitions in return for donations.

Decorations 
Chevalier de la Légion d'honneur (8 April 2012)

References 

1954 births
Living people
French women journalists
Chevaliers of the Légion d'honneur
Officers of the Ordre national du Mérite
Commandeurs of the Ordre des Arts et des Lettres
Writers from Le Havre
Sciences Po alumni
Nicolas Sarkozy